Tailing may refer to:
Tailings, the material left over after the extraction of ore from its host material
Lamb marking, a process applied in sheep husbandry, typically involving removal of a sheep's tail
Tailgating, driving on a road too closely behind another vehicle
Surveillance, following someone's movements
Polyadenylation, adding a poly(-A) tail to a nucleic acid

See also
Tail (disambiguation)